Sango, also known as Nyala and Nyangambe, is a village and ward (commune) in Masvingo Province, Zimbabwe on the Mozambique border.  The village supports the border post lying at the southern end of the Gonarezhou National Park.

The town on the Mozambique side of the border is Chicualacuala.

The old official name of the town was Vila Salazar.

Transports 

The village has a railway station on the Limpopo railway that connects it to the Mozambican city of Chicualacuala and the Zimbabwean city of Rutenga.

See also 
 Railway stations in Zimbabwe

References 

Populated places in Masvingo Province
Mozambique–Zimbabwe border crossings